Little Rocky Pond is an  pond in Plymouth, Massachusetts. The pond is located west of Little Sandy Pond and south of Ezekiel Pond and Whites Pond. The water quality is impaired due to non-native aquatic plants.

External links
Environmental Protection Agency

Ponds of Plymouth, Massachusetts
Ponds of Massachusetts